Union of Democratic Forces or Union of the Democratic Forces is the name of:

 Union of Democratic Forces (Bulgaria)
 Union of the Democratic Forces (France)
 Union of Democratic Forces of Guinea
 Union of Democratic Forces (Mauritania)
 Union of Democratic Forces (Republic of the Congo)

See also
 Turkmen Union of Democratic Forces
 Union of Democratic Forces for Progress, Mali
 Union of Democratic Forces for Unity, Central African Republic
 United Democratic Forces (disambiguation)
 United Democratic Front (disambiguation)